Narungga (also Narangga) is an Australian Aboriginal language spoken by the Narungga people in Yorke Peninsula, South Australia. As a result of the colonisation of Australia, the Narungga language fell into disuse within several generations. Nevertheless, Narungga continued to be documented into the 20th century, and the 1980s saw a community reclamation. As a result of revival efforts, the language along with Narungga culture is now being taught around the Yorke Peninsula, from Moonta and Maitland Area Schools to Point Pearce.

Narungga is one of the languages in the Yura group, which includes Nukunu, Kaurna, and Ngadjuri, among others, and belongs to the Pama–Nyungan family.

Notes

References

Thura-Yura languages
Yorke Peninsula